Joan Fageda Aubert (Olot, Catalonia, Spain, 20 January 1937) is a Spanish politician based in Mallorca in the People's Party. He was the mayor of Palma de Mallorca from 1991 to 2003.

He is now a senator in the Spanish senate.

References 

People from Olot
Mayors of places in the Balearic Islands
Members of the Senate of Spain
People's Party (Spain) politicians
Living people
1937 births